Mugarjhor High School is a private secondary school in Nazirpur Upazila, Pirojpur District, Barisal Division, Bangladesh. It is located in a remote area, near the village of Baithakata, and was founded in 1972.

See also
 Baithakata College

References

External links
 
 

High schools in Bangladesh
1972 establishments in Bangladesh
Buildings and structures in Barisal Division
Educational institutions established in 1972